Songkhla may refer to:

Places in Thailand
 Songkhla, a town
 Songkhla Province
 Mueang Songkhla District
 Songkhla Lake

See also
 Mahidol Adulyadej, Prince of Songkla